Crick is a small village or hamlet in the Welsh county of Monmouthshire, United Kingdom.  It is located on the A48 road 1 mile north of the town of Caldicot and 1 mile east of Caerwent.

History and amenities 
There is a Bronze Age round barrow just west of the village, measuring 31.7m in diameter and the only known bell barrow in Wales. It was excavated in 1940, and found to contain two cremations dating from around 1750-1450 BC.  It also contained boulders showing cup marks, which it has been suggested show astronomically significant alignments.

The site of Crick was an important junction on the Roman road sometimes known as the Via Julia which ran from Bath (Aquae Sulis) across the Severn estuary to Sudbrook and on to Caerwent (Venta Silurum) and Caerleon (Isca Augusta), now in Wales. At Crick the route met the roads to Gloucester (Glevum) and Monmouth (Blestium).

There is also evidence of an early Norman motte and bailey castle at Ballan Moor near Crick, probably built by the Ballon family in the late 11th or early 12th century.

In July 1645, during the English Civil War, a mediaeval hall at Crick was the site of a key meeting between King Charles, who had been recently defeated at Langport in Somerset, and his nephew and ally Prince Rupert of the Rhine.

David Broome, the former international equestrian show jumper is from the area and runs the David Broome Event Centre at Mount Ballan.

See also
 Nedern Brook Wetlands

References

External links 
Kelly's 1901 Directory of Monmouthshire
 Geograph photos of Crick

Villages in Monmouthshire